Brentford Baths is a Grade II listed building at Clifden Road, Brentford, London.

It was built in 1895–96, and the architect was Nowell Parr. The Baths closed in 1990 and later became a residential building.

In popular culture
 The interior scenes for the Cyberdelia nightclub in the 1995 movie Hackers were filmed in the pool.

References

Buildings and structures in the London Borough of Hounslow
Grade II listed buildings in the London Borough of Hounslow
Commercial buildings completed in 1896
Buildings by Nowell Parr